Bastogne may refer to:
Bastogne, a city in Belgium
Siege of Bastogne, part of the Battle of the Bulge during World War II
"Bastogne" (Band of Brothers), the Band of Brothers episode based on the Siege of Bastogne
Firebase Bastogne, a United States base during the Vietnam War